is a public park in Adachi Ward, Tokyo, Japan. It is the third biggest park in the 23 special wards of Tokyo. It was opened in 1981 to commemorate the 50th anniversary of Emperor Hirohito's rise to power. The park can be accessed from the adjacent Toneri-kōen Station.

Facilities
Toneri Park has tennis courts, water areas, and a bird sanctuary.

See also
 Parks and gardens in Tokyo
 National Parks of Japan

References

External links

Parks and gardens in Tokyo
1904 establishments in Japan
1981 establishments in Japan
Tourist attractions in Tokyo